Beatrice Utondu (born 23 November 1969) is a former sprinter from Nigeria who won an Olympic bronze medal in 4 x 100 metres relay in Barcelona 1992. She specialized in the 100 metres event, setting her personal best of 11.40 seconds during the 1991 World Championships and becoming the African champion in the event in 1993.

She also won long jump in the 1987 All-Africa Games.

Achievements

External links

1969 births
Living people
Nigerian female sprinters
Nigerian female long jumpers
Nigerian female high jumpers
Olympic athletes of Nigeria
Athletes (track and field) at the 1990 Commonwealth Games
Athletes (track and field) at the 1992 Summer Olympics
Olympic bronze medalists for Nigeria
Commonwealth Games medallists in athletics
Medalists at the 1992 Summer Olympics
Olympic bronze medalists in athletics (track and field)
Commonwealth Games silver medallists for Nigeria
Commonwealth Games bronze medallists for Nigeria
African Games gold medalists for Nigeria
African Games medalists in athletics (track and field)
Universiade medalists in athletics (track and field)
Athletes (track and field) at the 1987 All-Africa Games
Universiade silver medalists for Nigeria
Universiade bronze medalists for Nigeria
Medalists at the 1993 Summer Universiade
20th-century Nigerian women
Medallists at the 1990 Commonwealth Games